Lampedusa imitatrix (common name: Maltese door-snail) is a species of small, very elongate, air-breathing land snail, a terrestrial pulmonate gastropod mollusk in the family Clausiliidae, the door snails, all of which have a clausilium.

This species is endemic to Malta. The population on the islet of Filfla might be a subspecies or a species in its own right.

References

Lampedusa (gastropod)
Endemic fauna of Malta
Molluscs of Europe
Gastropods described in 1879
Taxa named by Oskar Boettger
Taxonomy articles created by Polbot